Sattleria sophiae is a moth in the family Gelechiidae. It was described by Timossi in 2014. It is found in the Dolomites of Italy.

References

Sattleria
Moths described in 2014